The Sierra Juárez is a range of mountains in Oaxaca state, Mexico between latitudes 17°20'-17°50'N and longitudes 96°15'-97°00'W, with an area of about 1,700 km² (656 sq mi). It is part of the Sierra Madre de Oaxaca. The range is separated from the Sierra de Zongólica to the north by the Santo Domingo River, flowing through the Tecomavaca Canyon. It stretches south-eastward to the Cajones River and the Sierra de Villa Alta. The mountains are in the district of Ixtlán de Juárez in the Sierra Norte de Oaxaca region. The range is named after Mexico's only indigenous president, Benito Juárez, who was born here in 1806 in the small village of San Pablo Guelatao.

Terrain and climate
They are formed of folded sedimentary rocks with series of younger granitic intrusions that date from the Palaeozoic to Cenozoic, with the majority being Mesozoic. The climate is subtropical in the lower regions and temperate and subhumid above , with average temperature from 16° to 20 °C (61° to 68 °F). There is regular frost in the higher mountains. The Valle Nacional River originates in the Sierra de Juárez, one of the major tributaries of the Papaloapan River.

Vegetation
The Sierra Juárez is one of Oaxaca State's wettest areas and richest in forest diversity, with perhaps 2,000 of the 8,000 or more plant species that are found in the state.
It is mostly covered by montane cloud forest, but includes tropical evergreen forests and forests of pine, pine-oak and oak. The climate is cool, 14°-20 °C (57°-68 °F), and has mean annual rainfall that exceeds  and is sometimes much higher.

Oak forests at a height from  grow in areas with relatively lower rainfall that have a dry season in summer. The oak forests are found in the western, inland part of the sierra to the Rio Grande Basin.

Animals
A species of alligator lizard, Mesaspis juarezi, is endemic to and named after the Sierra Juárez mountain range.

People
The Sierra Juárez is the land of the Sierra Zapotecs, of whom President Benito Juárez was one of the most famous.
The Zapotecs of the Sierra Norte, who call themselves the bene xon, are one of three major Zapotec regions in southern Mexico.  The other three reside in the Isthmus of Tehuantepec, the Valles Centrales region and the Sierra Madre Oriental. The bene xon divide into four sub-cultures: Cajonos, El Rincón, Ixtlán and Choapan.
Other indigenous people include the Chinantec, Mixe and Mixtec.

Environmental concerns
The Sierra Juárez is home to threatened mammals such as jaguar (Panthera onca), ocelot (Leopardus pardalis), and brocket deer (genus Mazama). It is also a habitat for the threatened dwarf jay (Cyanloyca nanus), and is the richest region in Mexico for butterflies. It is under stress from logging, agriculture, grazing, and colonization, and is potentially threatened by hydroelectric dams. There is no official plan to establish nature reserves. However, the region promotes ecotourism to help preserve the biosphere with various enterprises offering cabins, camping, access and guides for hiking and mountain-biking trails, horseback riding, bird-watching, and cave exploration.

References

Juarez
Sierra Madre de Oaxaca
Landforms of Oaxaca
Sierra Norte de Oaxaca